The 2007 Carolina Challenge Cup was a four-team round robin pre-season competition hosted by the Charleston Battery. The Houston Dynamo won the 2007 tournament and went on to win the MLS Cup, marking the fourth consecutive season that the champion went on to win one of the two year-end MLS trophies, the MLS Supporters' Shield or MLS Cup.

Teams
Four clubs competed in the tournament:

Standings

Matches

Scorers
3 goals
Ryan Cochrane (Houston Dynamo)
2 goals
Edson Buddle (Toronto FC)
Alecko Eskandarian (Toronto FC)
1 goal
Brian Ching (Houston Dynamo)
Abbe Ibrahim (Toronto FC)
Dema Kovalenko (New York Red Bulls)
Newton Sterling (Charleston Battery)
Dave van den Bergh (New York Red Bulls)
John Wolyniec (New York Red Bulls)
Chris Wondolowski (Houston Dynamo)

See also
 Carolina Challenge Cup
 Charleston Battery
 2007 in American soccer

External links
 Carolina Challenge Cup 2007

Carolina
2007
2007 in sports in South Carolina
Carolina Challenge

it:Carolina Challenge Cup#2007